The 1974 NCAA men's volleyball tournament was the fifth annual tournament to determine the national champion of NCAA men's college volleyball. The tournament was played at Robertson Gymnasium in Santa Barbara, California. The previous tournament format of round robin play for seeding followed by a single-elimination tournament was dropped in favor of going directly to a single-elimination bracket. The tournament field remained fixed at 4 teams.

Qualification
Until the creation of the NCAA Men's Division III Volleyball Championship in 2012, there was only a single national championship for men's volleyball. As such, all NCAA men's volleyball programs (whether from Division I, Division II, or Division III) were eligible. A total of 4 teams were invited to contest this championship.

Tournament play
The 1974 NCAA men's volleyball tournament was held on the UC Santa Barbara campus, and UC Santa Barbara was the heavy favorite to win it. UCLA made it to the NCAA tournament by upsetting Southern Cal in their district playoffs. The previous final four tournament format of round robin play for seeding followed by a single-elimination playoff was dropped in 1974 in favor of going directly to a single-elimination playoff. The tournament field remained limited to four teams. In the semi-finals UCLA defeated Ball State in straight sets while UCSB defeated Springfield in straight sets, setting up a championship final between perennial power UCLA against top ranked UCSB.

The championship match was a back and forth affair, with UCSB beating the Bruins in Games 1 and 3, while UCLA took games 2 and 4. Many of the Bruin kills were coming from a high tempo inside attack, with UCLA's Bob Leonard taking quick sets off of setter Jim Menges. In the game five clincher the Gauchos were up 6-1 before the Bruins rallied back with six straight points to lead 7-6. The two teams kept exchanging kills, with UCLA maintaining a slim lead to take the championship by the margin: 10-15, 15-8, 10-15, 15-11, 15-12. Leonard, Menges and Mike Normand were named to the All-Tournament team. UCLA ended the season 30-5. It was the fourth championship in five years for the Bruins. Menges earned All-American honors in his senior year at UCLA.

With the win UCLA had gained its fourth national title.

UCLA's Bob Leonard was named the Most Outstanding Player of the tournament.

Tournament bracket 
Site: Robertson Gymnasium, Santa Barbara, California

All tournament team 
Bob Leonard, UCLA (Most outstanding player)
Jim Menges, UCLA
Mike Normand, UCLA
Gerald Gregory, UC Santa Barbara
David DeGroot, UC Santa Barbara
Jon Roberts, UC Santa Barbara
Jim Stone, Ball State

See also 
 NCAA Men's National Collegiate Volleyball Championship

References

1974
NCAA Men's Volleyball Championship
NCAA Men's Volleyball Championship
Volleyball in California
1974 in sports in California
May 1974 sports events in the United States